Title 1 of the United States Code outlines the general provisions of the United States Code.

Chapter 1

  (Dictionary Act) – Words denoting number, gender, person, etc.
  – "County" as including "parish," etc.
  – "Vessel" as including all means of water transportation.
  – "Vehicle" as including all means of land transportation.
  – "Company" or "association" as including successors and assigns.
  – Limitation of term "products of American fisheries."
  – Definition of "marriage" and "spouse". (See Respect of Marriage Act)
  – "Person", "human being", "child", and "individual" as including born-alive infant. (See Born-Alive Infants Protection Act.)

Chapter 2

  – Enacting clause.
  – Resolving clause.
  – Enacting or resolving words after first section.
  – Numbering of sections; single proposition.
  – Title of appropriation Acts.
  – Printing bills and joint resolutions.
  – Promulgation of laws.
  – Amendments to Constitution.
  – Parchment or paper for printing enrolled bills or resolutions.
  – Repeal of repealing act.
  – Repeal of statutes as affecting existing liabilities.
  – Saving clause of Revised Statutes.
  – Repeals as evidence of prior effectiveness.
  – Statutes at Large; contents; admissibility in evidence.
  – United States Treaties and Other International Agreements; contents; admissibility in evidence.
  – United States international agreements; transmission to the United States Congress.
  – "Little and Brown's" edition of laws and treaties; slip laws; Treaties and Other International Act 1 Series; admissibility in evidence.
  – Sealing of instruments.

Chapter 3

  – Publication and distribution of Code of Laws of United States and Supplements and District of Columbia Code and Supplements.
  – Preparation and publication of Codes and Supplements.
  – District of Columbia Code; preparation and publication; cumulative supplements.
  – Codes and Supplements as evidence of the laws of United States and District of Columbia; citation of Codes and Supplements.
  – Codes and Supplement; where printed; form and style; ancillaries.
  – Bills and resolutions of Committee on the Judiciary of House of Representatives; form and style; ancillaries; curtailment of copies.
  – Copies of acts and resolutions in slip form; additional number printed for Committee on the Judiciary of House of Representatives.
  – Delegation of function of Committee on the Judiciary to other agencies; printing, etc., under direction of Joint Committee on Printing.
  – Copies of Supplements to Code of Laws of United States and of District of Columbia Code and Supplements; conclusive evidence of original.
  – Distribution of Supplements to Code of Laws of United States and of District of Columbia Code and Supplements; slip and pamphlet copies.
  – Copies to Members of Congress.
  – Additional distribution at each new Congress.
  – Appropriation for preparing and editing supplements.

History 
Title I was originally passed by the 80th Congress in 1947, along with titles 3, 4, 6, 9, & 17. Chapter 1 was influenced by the "Dictionary Act" passed in the 41st Congress.

References

External links
U.S. Code Title 1, via United States Government Printing Office
U.S. Code Title 1, via Cornell University
Title 1 of the United States Code on OpenJurist.org
United States Code Title 1, via Wikisource 

01